Theodore Roosevelt Monument is located in Tenafly, Bergen County, New Jersey, United States. The monument was added to the National Register of Historic Places on September 20, 2006.

See also
Presidential memorials in the United States
National Register of Historic Places listings in Bergen County, New Jersey

References

External links
 Information about the monument

Monuments and memorials on the National Register of Historic Places in New Jersey
Buildings and structures completed in 1928
Buildings and structures in Bergen County, New Jersey
Monuments and memorials in New Jersey
Roosevelt, Theodore
1928 sculptures
Stone sculptures in New Jersey
National Register of Historic Places in Bergen County, New Jersey
Tenafly, New Jersey
1928 establishments in New Jersey
New Jersey Register of Historic Places
Bison in art
Deer in art